Magnetica (known in Japan as  and in Europe as Actionloop) is a puzzle video game for the Nintendo DS, released as part of the Touch! Generations series. The game was developed by Mitchell Corporation and published by Nintendo, and is based on Mitchell's 1998 arcade game Puzz Loop.

The game was first revealed at Nintendo Japan's 2006 Conference. The European version came packaged with the Nintendo DS Rumble Pak.

A version for WiiWare, titled  in Japan, Magnetica Twist in North America and Actionloop Twist in PAL regions, was released in Japan on April 22, 2008, June 6, 2008 in Europe, and on June 30, 2008 in North America.

Gameplay
In the game, marbles roll down a twisted path toward the goal and the player must stop them by launching new marbles into the oncoming ones. The DS touchscreen is used to 'flick' the marbles from their launch point to their destination with the stylus. The marbles disappear if player matches three or more marbles of the same type; marbles of the same color are magnetically attracted to each other over any length of wide open space, and allowing for chains of disappearances to occur.

The game is over if any marble reaches a specific point, usually near the center of each level, but using the magnetic properties of the marbles can allow one to pull marbles away from this point. Bonus items attached to marbles can, for example, temporarily slow down the rate the marbles advance or cause all marbles of a color to disappear.

In addition to the main survival mode of play, the player can take part in a quest mode, where they must clear boards under certain conditions, and a puzzle mode, where a fixed arrangement of marbles around the board must be cleared using only the few marbles made available to the player.

WiiWare version
The WiiWare version of Magnetica supports up to four players simultaneously in either co-operative or competitive multiplayer modes, in addition to the ability to use the player's own Miis in the game. Control is done by twisting the Wii Remote left or right to turn the marble cannon, and an ability to lob marbles over others has been added.

The game features the challenge and quest modes of the DS version, but omits the puzzle mode. Extensive statistics are also kept for each player.

Reception

Magnetica and Magnetica Twist received "average" reviews according to the review aggregation website Metacritic. Nintendo Life said that although the DS version fails to impress with its visuals and audio, it is an excellent addition to anyone's Nintendo DS library whether a gamer is casual or hardcore. The Washington Post criticized the same console version's $35 price tag, which it said was a bit too much for a game that has nothing new to add. In Japan, Famitsu gave the same DS version a score of two eights, one seven, and one eight for a total of 31 out of 40.

References

External links
Official US Magnetica website
Official Japan Magnetica website
Japanese Magnetica Twist WiiWare website
Shunkan PuzzLoop Translation Page: Courtesy of DualScreenRadio
Insert Credit interview with Mitchell

2006 video games
Touch! Generations
Nintendo DS games
WiiWare games
Marble games
Nintendo games
Puzzle video games
Video games developed in Japan